Statistics of American Soccer League in season 1927–28.

Overview

New teams
During the 1927 off-season, Charles Stoneham bought Indiana Flooring and renamed it the New York Nationals.  In order to bring the number of teams back to twelve after the withdrawal of the Springfield Babes and Philadelphia Field Club the previous season, the league admitted the Hartford Americans and Philadelphia Celtic.

New format
With twelve teams in place, the league made significant changes to its schedule from the previous season.  Rather than running a single, 44 game, table for the entire season, the league split the season into two halves, each with its own table.  At the end of the season, the top two teams from each half would enter a playoff to determine the league championship.

Season
The first half of the 1927-28 season began September 10, 1927, and ended on January 8, 1928.  Ten games into the season, Philadelphia Celtic withdrew due to financial problems.  By this time, the Hartford Americans were also showing financial weakness.  Therefore, the league requested Hartford voluntarily withdraw from the league both to strengthen the league's financial position and to create a balanced schedule for the rest of the season.  By the end of the first half, Boston had finished at the top of the table, but Bethlehem Steel and New Bedford tied with forty-one points each.  This led to an improvised first half playoff game on February 22, 1928, between Bethlehem Steel and New Bedford to determine second place.  The second half of the season began on February 4, 1928, and ended on May 30, 1928.

Playoffs
The structural problems with the proposed playoff system became obvious by the end of the first half of the season.  As mentioned above, Bethleham Steel and New Bedford finished tied for second place.  This led to a playoff game which, ironically, did not take place until February 22, 1928, nearly two weeks after the second half of the season began.  In that game, played in Tiverton, Rhode Island, the Whalers defeated the Steelmen, 2-0.  Further complications arose at the end of the second half.  When New Bedford and the Fall River Marksmen finished as the top two teams this led to an unbalanced playoff.  The league had intended to have a four team playoff, but the playoff now consisted of three teams – Boston, New Bedford and Fall River.  Therefore, the league first decided to allow Bethlehem Steel to enter as the fourth team.  This led to a protest by the New York Nationals that they deserved to be the fourth team on account of finishing above Bethlehem Steel in the second half.  The league executives decided then to include both the Nationals and Bethlehem Steel, making the playoffs a five-team affair.  Bethlehem Steel defeated the Nationals in a two-game series, the first on June 4 and the second on June 6th.  Three days later, Bethlehem met the Boston Soccer Club in the first game of their semifinal series.  The Bethlehem players were clearly fatigued and their goalkeeper, Dave Edwards went down injured as Bethlehem lost.  Rather than travel back to their home stadium in Pennsylvania for the second leg of the series, Bethlehem elected to play at Hawthorne Stadium in Brooklyn.  This was home to the Brooklyn Wanderers.  While there, Bethlehem requested the Wanderers loan their goalkeeper, future Aberdeen great Steve Smith, to replace the injured Edwards.  However, Bethlehem Steel failed to notify league officials that Smith would be a guest player.  After Bethlehem won the game, 4-0, going through on aggregate, Boston lodged a complaint which the league sustained.  The second game was declared void and Boston's first leg victory became the deciding game in the semifinal.  In the other semifinal, the New Bedford Whalers defeated the Fall River Marksmen.  However, two players from each team were sent off in the second game.  Then Sturdy Maxwell, one of the ejected Whalers players got into a post-game fight with Tec White of the Marksmen.  The league suspended White and Maxwell, depriving the Whalers of their starting right half.  In the final between the Boston Soccer Club and New Bedford Whalers, both teams scored in the first half, but the Whalers clinched the championship with three second half goals by Barney Battles Jr.

League standings

First half

Second half

Playoffs

First half playoff
When Bethlehem Steel and New Bedford finished tied for second place during the first half of the season, this playoff game in February was used to determine the second place team for playoff purposes.

First round

Bethlehem Steel advances, 6–1, on aggregate

Semifinals

Seminfinal  1

The league voided the result of the second leg game after it was discovered Bethlehem Steel used Steve Smith, the Brooklyn Wanderers goalkeeper, in place of the injured Dave Edwards.

Boston advanced to the final.

Seminfinal  2

New Bedford advanced, 3–2, on aggregate

Final

League Cup
The winners of the League Cup final were awarded the H.E. Lewis Cup

Bracket

Semifinals

Bethlehem advances, 7–1, on aggregate.

Boston advances, 8–4, on aggregate.

Final

Bethlehem wins Lewis Cup, 5–4, on aggregate.

Goals leaders

External links
The Year in American Soccer - 1928

References

American Soccer League (1921–1933) seasons
American